Müllheim-Wigoltingen railway station is a railway station in the Swiss canton of Thurgau. It lies on the border between the municipality of Wigoltingen and the municipality of Müllheim. The station is located on the Winterthur–Romanshorn railway line. It is an intermediate stop on Zurich S-Bahn services S24 and S30.

References 

Railway stations in the canton of Thurgau
Swiss Federal Railways stations